Chizhov, feminine: Chizhova is the surname of:

Alexei Chizhov (born 1964), Russian international draughts player
Matthew Chizhov (1838–1916), Russian sculptor
Nadezhda Chizhova (born 1945), Russian shotputter
Oleksandr Chyzhov (born 1986), Ukrainian footballer
Sergey Chizhov (born 1964), Russian politician
Valeri Chizhov (born 1975), Russian footballer

See also

Chizhevsky

Russian-language surnames